

Friedrich Zickwolff (1 August 1893 – 17 September 1944) was a German general during World War II. He was a recipient of the Knight's Cross of the Iron Cross of Nazi Germany.

Zickwolff died on 17 September 1944 from an infectious disease contracted while serving on the Eastern Front. He was buried in the military cemetery in Ludwigsburg on 21 September 1944. In October 2021, against the background of official commemorations marking the 80th anniversary of the Babi Yar Massacre, Zickwolff's name appeared among the 161 names of the perpetrators of that crime, released by the Babi Year Holocaust Memorial Center. Troops under Zickwolff's command participated in the massacre.

Awards and decorations

 Knight's Cross of the Iron Cross on 2 June 1942 as Generalleutnant commander of 113. Infanterie-Division

References

Citations

Bibliography

 

1893 births
1944 deaths
Babi Yar
Holocaust perpetrators in Ukraine
Lieutenant generals of the German Army (Wehrmacht)
People from the Kingdom of Bavaria
German Army personnel killed in World War II
Recipients of the Iron Cross (1914), 1st class
Recipients of the clasp to the Iron Cross, 1st class
Recipients of the Knight's Cross of the Iron Cross
People from Bayreuth
Military personnel of Württemberg
Infectious disease deaths in Germany
Military personnel from Bavaria